Pinelema is a genus of Asian long-legged cave spiders that was first described by C. X. Wang & S. Q. Li in 2012.

Species
 it contains fifty-five species, found in China and Vietnam:

 Pinelema adunca (Wang & Li, 2010) — China
 Pinelema bailongensis Wang & Li, 2012 (type) — China
 Pinelema bella (Tong & Li, 2008) — China (Hainan)
 Pinelema bifida (Lin & Li, 2010) — China
 Pinelema biyunensis (Wang & Li, 2010) — China
 Pinelema breviseta (Tong & Li, 2008) — China (Hainan)
 Pinelema cheni Zhao & Li, 2018 — China
 Pinelema circularis (Tong & Li, 2008) — China
 Pinelema claviformis (Tong & Li, 2008) — China
 Pinelema conglobare (Lin & Li, 2010) — China
 Pinelema cordata (Wang & Li, 2010) — China
 Pinelema cucphongensis (Lin, Pham & Li, 2009) — Vietnam
 Pinelema cucurbitina (Wang & Li, 2010) — China
 Pinelema cunfengensis Zhao & Li, 2017 — China
 Pinelema curcici Wang & Li, 2016 — China
 Pinelema daguaiwan Zhao & Li, 2020 — China
 Pinelema damtaoensis Zhao & Li, 2018 — Vietnam
 Pinelema dengi (Tong & Li, 2008) — China (Hainan)
 Pinelema dongbei (Wang & Ran, 1998) — China
 Pinelema exiloculata (Lin, Pham & Li, 2009) — Vietnam
 Pinelema feilong (Chen & Zhu, 2009) — China
 Pinelema grandidens (Tong & Li, 2008) — China
 Pinelema huobaensis Wang & Li, 2016 — China
 Pinelema huoyan Zhao & Li, 2018 — China
 Pinelema laensis Zhao & Li, 2018 — Vietnam
 Pinelema liangxi (Zhu & Chen, 2002) — China
 Pinelema lizhuang Zhao & Li, 2018 — China
 Pinelema mikrosphaira (Wang & Li, 2010) — China
 Pinelema mulunensis Chen & Xu, 2021 — China
 Pinelema nuocnutensis Zhao & Li, 2018 — Vietnam
 Pinelema oculata (Tong & Li, 2008) — China
 Pinelema pacchanensis Zhao & Li, 2018 — Vietnam
 Pinelema pedati (Lin & Li, 2010) — China
 Pinelema podiensis Zhao & Li, 2017 — China
 Pinelema qingfengensis Zhao & Li, 2017 — China
 Pinelema renalis (Wang & Li, 2010) — China
 Pinelema shiba Zhao & Li, 2020 — China
 Pinelema spina (Tong & Li, 2008) — China (Hainan)
 Pinelema spinafemora (Lin & Li, 2010) — China
 Pinelema spirae (Lin & Li, 2010) — China
 Pinelema spirulata Zhao & Li, 2018 — Vietnam
 Pinelema strentarsi (Lin & Li, 2010) — China
 Pinelema tham Zhao & Li, 2020 — Laos
 Pinelema tortutheca (Lin & Li, 2010) — China
 Pinelema vesiculata (Lin & Li, 2010) — China
 Pinelema wangshang Zhao & Li, 2018 — China
 Pinelema wenyang Zhao & Li, 2018 — China
 Pinelema xiezi Zhao & Li, 2018 — Vietnam
 Pinelema xiushuiensis Wang & Li, 2016 — China
 Pinelema yaosaensis Wang & Li, 2016 — China
 Pinelema yashanensis (Wang & Li, 2010) — China
 Pinelema yunchuni Zhao & Li, 2018 — China
 Pinelema zhenzhuang Zhao & Li, 2018 — Vietnam
 Pinelema zhewang (Chen & Zhu, 2009) — China
 Pinelema zonaria (Wang & Li, 2010) — China

See also
 List of Telemidae species

References

Araneomorphae genera
Spiders of China
Telemidae